The 1998–1999 Connecticut Huskies men's basketball team represented the University of Connecticut in the 1998–1999 NCAA Division I basketball season. Coached by Jim Calhoun, the Huskies played their home games at the Hartford Civic Center in Hartford, Connecticut, and on campus at the Harry A. Gampel Pavilion in Storrs, Connecticut, and were a member of the Big East Conference.  They won their fourth Big East tournament.  On March 29, 1999, they claimed their first national championship by defeating Duke, 77–74.

Roster
Listed are the student athletes who were members of the 1998–1999 team.

Schedule 

|-
!colspan=12 style=""| Regular Season

|-
!colspan=12 style=""| Big East tournament

|-
!colspan=12 style=""| NCAA tournament

Schedule Source:

Awards and honors
 Richard Hamilton, NCAA Men's MOP Award

Team players drafted into the NBA

References

UConn Huskies men's basketball seasons
NCAA Division I men's basketball tournament championship seasons
NCAA Division I men's basketball tournament Final Four seasons
Connecticut
Connecticut Huskies
1998 in sports in Connecticut
1999 in sports in Connecticut